Anavatapta (Sanskrit अनवतप्त "the Unheated", also called  "the Pond without Heat") is the lake lying at the center of the world, according to ancient Indian tradition. The name Anavatapta means "heat-free"; the waters of the lake were thought to be able to soothe the fires that torment beings. Anavatapta is also the name of the dragon that was said to live in the lake; having become a bodhisattva, it was free from the distresses that plague other dragons, which are tormented by fiery heat and preyed on by garudas.

According to Charles Higham, Lake Anavatapta was a "sacred Himalayan lake imbued with miraculous curative powers to remove human sins."  George Cœdès states the lake, "...according to Indian tradition, is located in the confines of the Himalayas, and its waters gush out of gargoyles in the form of the heads of animals."

Lying south of Perfume Mountain, Lake Anavatapta is said to be 800 li in circumference and bordered by gold, silver, and precious stones. Four rivers issued from the lake. The earthly manifestation of the lake is often identified with Lake Manasarovar, which lies at the foot of Mount Kailash (Gandhamadana or Perfume Mountain) in the Himalayas. The four mythical rivers are sometimes identified with the Ganges (east), the Indus (south), the Amu Darya (west), and the Tarim or the Yellow River (north).

See also
 Neak Pean

References

Buddhist cosmology